S. exigua may refer to:

 Salix exigua, a willow native to North America
 Scirpus exigua, a spikesedge with a long stem
 Scopula exigua, a grass moth
 Selliera exigua, a flowering plant
 Sertularella exigua, a thecate hydroid
 Slackia exigua, a gram-positive bacterium
 Solariella exigua, a sea snail
 Somena exigua, a Sri Lankan moth
 Sophora exigua, a plant that releases Sophoraflavanone G into its environment
 Sphenoptera exigua, a jewel beetle
 Spodoptera exigua, an owlet moth
 Stelis exigua, a leach orchid
 Stenelmis exigua, a riffle beetle
 Stephanomeria exigua, a plant native to the western United States
 Synechodes exigua, a little bear moth